Rosalind Barber (born 1964) is an English novelist and poet. She is also a university lecturer in English, who supports the view that Christopher Marlowe wrote Shakespeare.

Academia
As of 2021, Barber lectures in the Department of English and Comparative Literature at Goldsmiths, University of London. She has a BSc in Biology, an MA in creative writing, the arts and education, and a PhD in English literature, all from the University of Sussex. She also has an Open University BA in English literature and philosophy.

Barber has worked as a computer programmer. She won the Hoffman Prize in 2011, 2014 and 2018.

Novels
Barber's first novel, The Marlowe Papers (2012), is written in blank verse. She subscribes to the Marlovian theory of Shakespeare authorship. In the book, Marlowe's death is a ruse and he writes plays in Shakespeare's name. The book won the Desmond Elliott Prize and the Authors' Club First Novel Award. Her second novel, Devotion (2015), was shortlisted for the Encore Award.

Barber made an appearance at the Brighton Fringe in 2012. She and Nicola Haydn wrote a one-man stage adaptation of The Marlowe Papers performed in 2016.

Poetry
Of Barber's three volumes of poetry, Material (2008) was a Poetry Book Society recommendation. Its title poem, which also appears in the Faber anthology Poems of the Decade (2015), was in England's school sixth-form syllabus as of 2017.

Bibliography

Novels
The Marlowe Papers (2012)
Devotion (2015)

Poetry
How Things Are On Thursday (2004)
Not the Usual Grasses Singing (2005)
Material (2008)

Non-fiction
30 Second Shakespeare (2015)

References

External links
Staff page at Goldsmiths, University of London
Ros Barber at Royal Literary Fund
Material Poem Analysis and Commentary
The Bard didn’t use Warwickshire dialect – so was he really Shakespeare?, article by Barber at The Conversation

1964 births
21st-century English poets
21st-century English novelists
English women poets
Living people
Alumni of the University of Sussex
21st-century English women writers
Marlovian theory of Shakespeare authorship